Euriphene simplex, the simple nymph, is a butterfly in the family Nymphalidae. It is found in Guinea, Sierra Leone, Liberia, Ivory Coast and Ghana. The habitat consists of forests.

References

Butterflies described in 1891
Euriphene
Butterflies of Africa